Ivan Dodig and Rajeev Ram were the defending champions, but Dodig chose not to participate and Ram chose to compete in Estoril instead.

Frederik Nielsen and Tim Pütz won the title, defeating Marcelo Demoliner and Divij Sharan in the final, 6–4, 6–2.

Seeds

Draw

Draw

References

External Links
 Main Draw

Doubles